The 1960 Italian local elections were held on 6 and 7 November. The elections were held in 6,900 municipalities and 78 provinces.

Municipal elections
Results summary of the 82 provincial capital municipalities.

Provincial elections
Results summary of 77 provinces. The elections were not held in the provinces of Gorizia, Vercelli and due to force majeure in the province of Rovigo.

External links

1960 elections in Italy
 
Municipal elections in Italy
November 1960 events in Europe